Djehuty is another name for Thoth, an ancient Egyptian god.

Djehuty or Djehuti is also the given name of:

 Djehuti, also spelled Djehuty, 17th century BC Egyptian pharaoh of uncertain reign
 Djehuty (general), 15th century BC general under Thutmose III
 Djehuty (High Priest of Amun), 14th century BC priest of the 18th Dynasty
 Djehuty (overseer of the treasury), 14th century BC official of the 18th Dynasty under Queen Hatshepsut

See also
 Jehuty, a fictional entity in the Zone of the Enders game
 Zehuti (Thoth), one of the gods from whom Black Adam, a DC Comics villain, derives his powers

Ancient Egyptian given names